BNS Atondro is a  offshore patrol vessel of the Bangladesh Navy. She is serving the Bangladesh Navy since 2013.

Career
The ship was ordered on 2 May 2010. The contract was awarded to Khulna Shipyard in Khulna, Bangladesh, where the keel was laid in 2012. The ship was launched in 2013 and commissioned on 23 December 2013. She is currently serving under the command of Commanding Commodore BN Khulna (COMKHUL).

Due to inclement weather in the Bay of Bengal, a fishing boat containing 11 fishermen sunk near Sonadia, Cox's Bazar. BNS Atondro rushed there and rescued 9 fishermen and the sunken boat.

Design
The patrol vessel has a displacement of 350 tonnes. The complement is 45 persons and the ship can carry out missions lasting up to seven days at a time.

Armament
The ship is equipped with a pair of 20 mm anti-aircraft guns and a pair of 37 mm guns. In addition it carries naval mines and MANPADS.

See also
List of active ships of the Bangladesh Navy

References

Ships of the Bangladesh Navy
Patrol vessels of the Bangladesh Navy
Padma-class Patrol Vessel
2013 ships
Ships built at Khulna Shipyard